Kandhla is a town, near Shamli City and municipal board in Shamli District in the Indian state of Uttar Pradesh.

Geography 
It has an average elevation of 241 meters (790 feet). The Postal Code (Zip Code) is 247775. Sunna, Kiwana, aaldi panjokhra, gujjarpur, jasala, bharsi, bhabisa, lisarh, hazipur, dangrol and dugadda, ganggeru, Nala Jaato ka village and Ailum 'gadi shyam, are some villages located in its zone. It has a wide range of culture.

Transport 
Kandhla is situated midway on the State Highway connecting Delhi to Saharanpur via Baghpat Baraut Shamli  [DELHI – Baghpat – Baraut – Kandhla – Shamli – Thana Bhawan – Jalalabad – Nanauta – SAHARANPUR ].  The above route is also accessible and connected by Broad Gauge Train Link.

The major Important Towns and Cities in the neighbourhood are

 Delhi 50 miles (80 km), on the South,
 Saharanpur 50 miles (80 km), on the North,
 Muzaffar Nagar 31 Miles (50 km), on the East
 Meerut 50 miles (80 km), on the South East,
 Panipat 22 miles (33 km), on the west,
 Karnal 45 miles (72 km), on the North west

Demographics 
 India census, The Kandhla Nagar Palika Parishad has population of 46,796 of which 24,535 are males while 22,261 are females as per report released by Census India 2011. 
Population of Children with age of 0–6 is 7788 which is 16.64% of total population of Kandhla (NPP). In Kandhla Nagar Palika Parishad, Female Sex Ratio is of 907 against state average of 912. Moreover, Child Sex Ratio in Kandhla is around 884 compared to Uttar Pradesh state average of 902. Literacy rate of Kandhla city is 55.43% lower than state average of 67.68%. In Kandhla, Male literacy is around 63.57% while female literacy rate is 46.51%.

Religion

The Lakshmi Narayan Mandir, Jama Masjid and Makkah Masjid Molanan, Nilgaro Wali Masjid, Talaab vala Mandir, Shiva Mandir Jasala, are a few famous places of Kandhla. It is the only town where, Jama Masjid and Laxmi Narayana Mandir  are adjacent to each other on one foundation.

Notable people 
 Muhammad Ilyas Kandhlawi – Founder of Tablighi Jamaat
 Muhammad Zakariya Kandhlawi – Sunni Hanafi Hadith scholar who wrote Fazail-e-Amaal.
 Muhammad Idris Kandhlawi – Former Shaykh al-Hadith wat-Tafsir Jamia Ashrafia Lahore
 Muhammad Yusuf Kandhlawi – 2nd Amir of Tablighi Jamaat
 Inamul Hasan Kandhlawi – 3rd Amir of Tablighi Jamaat
 Iftikhar-ul-Hasan Kandhlawi –  Indian Islamic scholar, He laid the foundation of Idgah of Kandhla in the year 1946.
 Maulana Zubair ul Hassan – Indian Islamic scholar and Member of Alami Shura Tablighi Jamaat
 Muhammad Saad Kandhlawi – 4th Amir of Tablighi Jamaat
 Ehsan Danish - Prominent Urdu poet and Pakistani Scholar
 G. D. Agrawal -  Environmentalist

See also 

 Kandhlawi
 Kandhla (Assembly constituency)
 Kairana and Kandhla migration controversy

References 

Cities and towns in Shamli district